Black Tiger (stylized in all caps) is a Japanese manga series written and illustrated by Osamu Akimoto. It has been serialized in Shueisha's seinen manga magazine Grand Jump since December 2016.

Premise
In the turmoil following the American Civil War, security in the south has rapidly declined. In response, the United States government significantly increased the reward for bounties and issues licenses to kill to the best bounty hunters. The series follows one of these "Black Members", the female gunslinger Black Tiger.

Production
Osamu Akimoto said Black Tiger came from having always wanted to draw a Western, recalling that everyone loved Spaghetti Westerns when he was a kid. Although he previously created one with the 2015 one-shot Allie, Shoot Your Gun, he said that there are many historical dramas nowadays, but no Westerns. He also described Black Tiger as an homage to manga artist Mikiya Mochizuki, who died in 2016, and his series Wild 7, where a bad guy defeats a bad guy.

Although it is Akimoto's first series following the completion of KochiKame: Tokyo Beat Cops (1976–2016), Black Tiger has a different style because it is serialized in a seinen manga magazine and he said it feels like a new start as a result. He said his roots are in gekiga and described the characters of Black Tiger as being gekiga, which means they do not speak much. The artist noted how even when he drew gun-shooting scenes in Mr. Clice, he did not show blood, but now he wants to draw more freely. Despite stating that drawing women has always been a weakness of his, Akimoto said strong-minded girls are easy and interesting to draw, so he wanted to use one as the main character.

Publication
Written and illustrated by Osamu Akimoto, Black Tiger started in Shueisha's seinen manga magazine Grand Jump on December 21, 2016. The manga was published on an irregular basis until November 2019, when it started a regular serialization in the magazine. The series is set to end after four chapters starting on December 21, 2022. Shueisha has collected its chapters into individual tankōbon volumes. The first volume was released on November 2, 2017, and includes the 2015 one-shot . As of March 18, 2022, nine volumes have been released.

Volume list

References

External links
 
 

Action anime and manga
Seinen manga
Shueisha manga
Western (genre) anime and manga